Ophichthus grandoculis, known commonly as the snake-eel in Malaysia, is an eel in the family Ophichthidae (worm/snake eels). It was described by Theodore Edward Cantor in 1849, originally under the genus Ophisurus. It is a marine, tropical eel which is known from Malaysia, in the eastern Indian Ocean.

References

grandoculis
Fish described in 1849